The 2016 Villanova Wildcats football team represented Villanova University in the 2016 NCAA Division I FCS football season. They were led by 32nd-year head coach Andy Talley and played their home games at Villanova Stadium. They were a member of the Colonial Athletic Association. They finished the season 9–4, 6–2 in CAA play to finish in a tie for second place. They received an at-large bid to the FCS Playoffs where they defeated St. Francis (PA) in the first round before losing in the second round to South Dakota State. The 2016 season is Talley's final season as the Wildcats' head coach.

Schedule

Game summaries

at Pittsburgh

Lehigh

Towson

at Lafayette

at Elon

Rhode Island

at Richmond

Albany

at Maine

James Madison

at Delaware

FCS Playoffs

First Round–Saint Francis (PA)

Second Round–South Dakota State

Ranking movements

References

Villanova
Villanova Wildcats football seasons
Villanova
Villanova Wildcats football